A penumbral lunar eclipse took place on Friday, April 4,  1958, the first of three lunar eclipses in 1958. This was the last penumbral lunar eclipse of Saros cycle 102. In this extremely marginal eclipse, the Moon barely clipped the edge of the Earth's penumbral shadow. This caused a microscopic darkening of just 1% of the Moon's disc for 31 minutes exactly, which was essentially impossible to see.

Visibility

Related lunar eclipses

Lunar year series

See also
List of lunar eclipses
List of 20th-century lunar eclipses

Notes

External links

1958-04
1958 in science